Poplar High School is a high school (grades 9–12) in the small town of Poplar, Roosevelt County, Montana, United States.

In 2007 it had 200 plus students and 25 teachers.

See also 
 List of high schools in Montana

Notes

External links 
 Poplar School District website

Schools in Roosevelt County, Montana
Public high schools in Montana